Shadiman Baratashvili was a political figure in Kingdom of Kartli at the end of the 16th and the beginning of the 17th centuries.

Shadiman was a royal tutor and actually ran the government during minority of Luarsab II of Kartli. After the death of the latter's wife, the lords opposing Luarsab, led by Shadiman, managed to turn Luarsab against Giorgi Saakadze. Saakadze, who had been warned just in time, managed to escape to Persia in 1612.

References

Sources
 

Nobility of Georgia (country)
16th-century people from Georgia (country)
17th-century people from Georgia (country)